Taste receptor type 2 member 40 is a protein that in humans is encoded by the TAS2R40 gene.

See also
 Taste receptor

References

Further reading

Human taste receptors